Judge Ramos may refer to:

Edgardo Ramos (born 1960), judge of the United States District Court for the Southern District of New York
Jeannette Ramos (1932–2021), judge of the Court of Appeals of Puerto Rico
Nelva Gonzales Ramos (born 1965), judge of the United States District Court for the Southern District of Texas
Roberto Sánchez Ramos (fl. 1980s–2020s), judge of the Court of Appeals of Puerto Rico